Ancylometis scaeocosma is a species of moth in the family Oecophoridae first described by Edward Meyrick in 1887. It is known from Réunion.

This species has a wingspan of 11 mm for the male. The head and palpi are dark fuscous, antennae greyish-ochreous, thorax and abdomen greyish-ochreous, irrorated (sprinkled) with dark fuscous. The forewings are elongated and rather narrow with a gently arched costa; they are whitish-ochreous, irrorated with dark fuscous, tinged with yellowish round dark markings, and a small dark fuscous basal patch. The hindwings are grey, paler and semi-transparent towards their base.

References

Moths described in 1887
Oecophoridae
Moths of Réunion
Endemic fauna of Réunion